Borden is a village in the Canadian province of Saskatchewan within the Rural Municipality of Great Bend No. 405 and Census Division No. 16. Borden is named after Sir Frederick William Borden, Minister of Militia in the Laurier Cabinet. An abandoned arch bridge of the same name (Borden Bridge) is located to the southeast and once carried Highway 16 across the North Saskatchewan River.

History 
Borden incorporated as a village on July 19, 1907.

Demographics 

Notable people
 David Orchard, (born June 28, 1950, in Borden, Saskatchewan) is a Canadian political figure and a member of the Liberal Party of Canada.

See also 

 List of communities in Saskatchewan
 Villages of Saskatchewan

References

External links

Villages in Saskatchewan
Great Bend No. 405, Saskatchewan
Division No. 16, Saskatchewan